Kaliningrad Railway is the smallest subsidiary of the Russian Railways by route length (618 km) and differs from other Russian railways in having a string of standard gauge lines.

Main information
The railway is headquartered in Kaliningrad. Most lines were built by the Prussian Eastern Railway before the Second World War. The railway terminal in Kaliningrad, currently known as Yuzhny Vokzal, was opened in 1929 as Königsberg Hauptbahnhof. It was separated from the Pribaltic Railway after the breakup of the Soviet Union in 1992.

A two lines are electrified and are used by commuter EMU traffic.

External links 

 

Kaliningrad
Rail transport in Kaliningrad Oblast
Railway lines in Russia
Railway companies established in 1996
Standard gauge railways in Russia